General elections were held in the Dominican Republic on 1 June 1966. Following the 1963 coup which toppled elected president Juan Bosch of the Dominican Revolutionary Party, supporters of his constitutional reforms were excluded from the elections, although Bosch himself contested them. The result was a victory for Joaquín Balaguer of the Reformist Party, whilst his party also won the Congressional elections. Voter turnout was 75.6%.

Results

President

Congress

See also
1963 Dominican coup d'état
Dominican Civil War

References

Dominican Republic
1966 in the Dominican Republic
Elections in the Dominican Republic
Presidential elections in the Dominican Republic
Election and referendum articles with incomplete results
June 1966 events in North America